St. Peter's Church is church located in the Norrmalm district of Stockholm, Sweden. It was designed by Erik Lallerstedt and built in the Art Nouveau style 1900–1901.

See also
 List of churches in Stockholm

References

External links 

 

Art Nouveau church buildings in Sweden
Churches in Stockholm
Churches completed in 1901
Art Nouveau architecture in Stockholm
Uniting Church in Sweden churches